Rhodochrosite is a manganese carbonate mineral with chemical composition MnCO3. In its pure form (rare), it is typically a rose-red colour, but it can also be shades of pink to pale brown. It streaks white, and its Mohs hardness varies between 3.5 and 4.5. Its specific gravity is between 3.45 and 3.6. It crystallizes in the trigonal system, and cleaves with rhombohedral carbonate cleavage in three directions. Crystal twinning often is present. It is often confused with the manganese silicate, rhodonite, but is distinctly softer. Rhodochrosite is formed by the oxidation of manganese ore, and is found in South Africa, China, and the Americas. It is officially listed as one of the National symbols of Argentina.

Rhodochrosite forms a complete solid solution series with iron carbonate (siderite). Calcium (as well as magnesium and zinc, to a limited extent) frequently substitutes for manganese in the structure, leading to lighter shades of red and pink, depending on the degree of substitution. This is the reason for the pink color of rhodochrosite.

Occurrence and discovery
Rhodochrosite occurs as a hydrothermal vein mineral along with other manganese minerals in low temperature ore deposits as in the silver mines of Romania where it was first found. Banded rhodochrosite is mined in Capillitas, Argentina.

It was first described in 1813 in reference to a sample from Cavnic, Maramureş, present-day Romania. The name is derived from the combination of Greek words ροδόν (rodon, meaning rose) and χρωσις (chrosis, meaning coloring).

Use
Rhodochrosite is mainly used as an ore of manganese, which is a key component of low-cost stainless steel formulations and certain aluminium alloys. Quality banded specimens are often used for decorative stones and jewellery. Due to its softness and perfect cleavage it is rarely found faceted in jewellery.

Manganese carbonate is extremely destructive to the amalgamation process historically used in the concentration of silver ores, and were often discarded on the mine dump.

Culture

Rhodochrosite is Argentina's "national gemstone". Colorado officially named rhodochrosite as its state mineral in 2002.

It is sometimes called "Rosa del Inca", "Inca Rose" or Rosinca.

Gallery

See also
 List of minerals
 Manganoan calcite

References

 Hurlbut, Cornelius S.; Klein, Cornelis, 1985, Manual of Mineralogy, 20th ed., .

External links 

 

Carbonate minerals
Manganese(II) minerals
Symbols of Colorado
Trigonal minerals
Minerals in space group 167
National symbols of Argentina